Tomislav Božić (born 1 November 1987) is a Croatian footballer who plays as a defender, currently for Slaven Belupo in the Croatian First Football League. He has represented his country at youth level.

Club career

Early career
Božić began his professional career with the Croatian first level side NK Kamen Ingrad for whom he appeared 34 times in the 2005–06 and 2006–07 1.HNL seasons, before moving abroad and joining the Bosnian side NK Široki Brijeg. In August 2009, he returned to Croatia and joined the Druga HNL side HNK Suhopolje on a free transfer. In summer 2010, Božić played on trial at the Czech club Slavia Prague, scoring in a friendly match against Plzeň but ultimately not joining the club. He then joined the Prva HNL side HNK Cibalia Vinkovci where he was a regular first-team member for one season. In 2011, Božić joined HNK Gorica in the Croatian Druga HNL.

Czech Republic
After an unsuccessful trial with Viktoria Plzeň, he signed with Dukla Prague, a team newly promoted to the Czech Gambrinus liga, in January 2012. In January 2013, he signed a contract extension, keeping him at Dukla until summer 2014. Božić scored his first Gambrinus liga goal for Dukla in March 2013, in the second half of a 4–0 home win against the bottom-of-the-league team České Budějovice.

Slaven Belupo
On 3 July 2019, Božić joined Slaven Belupo.

International career
Božić was capped seven times for Croatia's U-19, U-20 and U-21 national teams between 2006 and 2007.

Personal life
Božić is married and has a son.

References

External links
 
 
 
 
 Profile  at the playersagent.com

1987 births
Living people
People from Požega-Slavonia County
Association football defenders
Croatian footballers
Croatia youth international footballers
Croatia under-21 international footballers
NK Kamen Ingrad players
NK Široki Brijeg players
HNK Suhopolje players
HNK Cibalia players
HNK Gorica players
FK Dukla Prague players
Górnik Łęczna players
Wisła Płock players
Miedź Legnica players
NK Slaven Belupo players
Croatian Football League players
Premier League of Bosnia and Herzegovina players
Czech First League players
Ekstraklasa players
I liga players
Croatian expatriate footballers
Expatriate footballers in Bosnia and Herzegovina
Expatriate footballers in the Czech Republic
Expatriate footballers in Poland
Croatian expatriate sportspeople in Bosnia and Herzegovina
Croatian expatriate sportspeople in the Czech Republic
Croatian expatriate sportspeople in Poland